Mohammad Ali Sanatkaran (born 18 March 1938) is a retired Iranian freestyle wrestler. He won a gold and a silver medal at the world championships in 1961 and 1965, and a bronze medal at the 1964 Olympics.

References

 

Olympic wrestlers of Iran
Wrestlers at the 1964 Summer Olympics
Iranian male sport wrestlers
Olympic bronze medalists for Iran
Living people
Olympic medalists in wrestling
1938 births
World Wrestling Championships medalists
Medalists at the 1964 Summer Olympics
20th-century Iranian people
World Wrestling Champions